COP9 signalosome complex subunit 1 is a protein that in humans is encoded by the GPS1 gene.

This gene is known to suppress G-protein and mitogen-activated signal transduction in mammalian cells. The encoded protein shares significant similarity with Arabidopsis FUS6, which is a regulator of light-mediated signal transduction in plant cells. Two alternatively spliced transcript variants encoding different isoforms have been found for this gene.

References

Further reading